Forollhogna National Park is a national park in the counties of Trøndelag and Innlandet in  Norway. Forollhogna (or Forelhogna) park includes extensive plant life and is an important range for wild reindeer. The park lies in the municipalities of Tynset, Tolga, and Os in Innlandet and Holtålen, Midtre Gauldal, and Rennebu in Trøndelag.

The scenery of Forollhogna consists of large alpine areas, with gentle slopes rising from the valleys below—an area often referred to as "the gentle mountains". Here are thriving villages and a lush cultural landscape formed by the region's farming traditions. For centuries the mountain farms have been in use during the summer, and many still are. This is the setting of Forollhogna National Park, Norway's 19th park to be so designated.

Name
The name is a composition of two words.  The last element is the finite form of hogn which means "defender" or "protector" (this tall and impressive mountain marks the border between Trøndelag and Innlandet). The first element comes the name of the lake in the central part of the park: Forollen (Forollsjøen).

References

National parks of Norway
Protected areas established in 2001
Protected areas of Trøndelag
Protected areas of Hedmark
Tourist attractions in Trøndelag
Tourist attractions in Hedmark
2001 establishments in Norway
Tynset
Os, Innlandet
Tolga, Norway
Holtålen
Midtre Gauldal
Rennebu